This is a list of Scottish Green Party MSPs. It includes all Members of the Scottish Parliament (MSPs) who represented the Scottish Greens in the Scottish Parliament.

List of MSPs

Notes

References

External links
 Current and previous Members of the Scottish Parliament (MSPs), on the Scottish Parliament website
 Scottish Green Party

Green
List